Diaphorina citri, the Asian citrus psyllid, is a sap-sucking, hemipteran bug in the family Psyllidae. It is one of two confirmed vectors of citrus greening disease. It has a wide distribution in southern Asia and has spread to other citrus growing regions.

Distribution
The Asian citrus psyllid originated in Asia but it is now also found in parts of the Middle East, South and Central America, Mexico, and the Caribbean. In the United States, the psyllid was first detected in Florida in 1998 and is now also found in Louisiana, Georgia, Arizona, South Carolina, Texas, and since 2003 in California. In Southern California, the San Joaquin Valley, and Central Coast counties, such as San Luis Obispo, an eradication program has been instituted in an attempt to prevent it from becoming established. In the whole of the United States and its territories, areas where this psyllid are found are under quarantine restrictions.

Description

The adult psyllid is about four millimetres long with a fawn and brown mottled body and a light brown head. It is covered with a whitish, waxy secretion which makes it look dusty. The forewings are broadest at the back and have a dark edging around the periphery with a pale gap near the apex. The antennae are pale brown with black tips. These features distinguish it from the superficially similar African citrus psyllid. It typically adopts a head down, tail up posture as it sucks sap. Aphids are often also present on citrus and psyllids can be distinguished from them by being more active, jumping insects, whereas aphids are sedentary. In addition, the antennae of a psyllid has ten segments whereas those of aphids usually have four or six segments. Most aphids have cornicles on the abdomen and psyllids lack these.

The psyllid nymph moults five times. It is a yellowish-orange color and has no abdominal spots. The wing pads are prominent, especially in the later instars.

The eggs are approximately 0.3 millimeters long, almond-shaped, thicker at the base and tapering toward the top. They are at first a pale color but turn yellow and later orange before they hatch. The long axis is placed vertical to the surface of the leaf.

Microbiome 
The psyllid has a bacteriome organ specialized for carrying two of its bacterial symbioants. Candidatus Carsonella ruddii, which provides nutrition, lives inside uninuclear bacteriocytes around the organ. Ca. Profftella armatura, which provides nutrition, defense toxins, and carotenoids, lives inside the syncytial cytoplasm of the organ. Polyketide synthesis by the Profftella symbioant is increased when the insect is carrying the huanglongbing pathogen Liberibacter.

Another insect of the same genus, Diaphorina cf. continua (open nomenclature term describing an unnamed species similar to Diaphorina continua), shares bacteriome symbioants.

The insect can be infected by Wolbachia, which is then transmitted vertically via the egg. Wolbachia and Liberibacter can reside either within the U-shaped bacteriome, or mingle with gut cells as part of the gut microbiome. Wolbachia is able to help Liberibacter survive bacteriophages by inhibiting cell lysis.

Life cycle
Eggs are laid on the tips of growing shoots, between and near the unfolding leaves. A female may lay up to 800 eggs during her lifetime which may be several months. The whole development cycle takes from two to seven weeks depending on the temperature and the time of year.

Predation
The wasps  Brachygastra mellifica and Tamarixia radiata are a common parasitoids of D. citri. Lady beetles are also important predators.

Damage
Psyllid nymphs are found on new shoots of citrus trees. As they feed, they produce a toxin that causes the plant tips to die back or become contorted, preventing the leaves from expanding normally. However, direct damage from feeding by the psyllid is considered minor compared with the role the psyllid plays as the only known nonhuman vector of citrus greening disease.

Citrus greening disease and other associations

Feeding can vector bacteria that causes one of the most devastating of citrus diseases, citrus greening disease. Affected trees bear small, asymmetrical fruit which are partially green and which are unsellable because of their poor size and quality. There is laboratory evidence indicating it can also transmit another serious citrus disease caused by the Tristeza virus.

Control
The Asian citrus psyllid has a number of natural enemies including hoverflies, lacewings, several species of ladybird and a number of species of parasitic wasp. One of these wasps, Tamarixia radiata, has proved very effective at controlling the pest and has been successfully released and become established in a number of citrus growing areas including Florida. Both adults and nymphs of the psyllid can be controlled by the use of a wide range of insecticides. Citrus greening disease is best controlled through an integrated strategy involving the use of healthy planting material, the control of vectors, and the prompt removal of infected trees and branches.

Recent efforts have focussed on understanding the various sensory cues that the psyllid uses to locate its host plant. Insight into the insect's behavior may lead to better methods for its control. One study demonstrated that perception of reflected ultraviolet wavelengths enhanced attraction to a yellow trap. Attempts to demonstrate attraction of the psyllid to volatile (air-borne) odors have failed to produce an effective attractant. It appears that this tiny insect is attracted by color (yellow and UV wavelengths) and decides to stay and feed on a particular plant only after alighting on a leaf and tasting it by probing with its mouthparts (stylets). Small molecules such as formic acid and acetic acid stimulate probing activity. These may be used in new, innovative traps or other devices.

Recent effort has illustrated that the spatial distribution of eggs and nymphs is a result of the movement patterns of gravid females in response to the oviposition sites. The dispersion indices were used to confirm the aggregated or contagious distribution pattern of D. citri population on the flushes within the tree and could be expressed by the negative binomial distribution. Measurable tests showed that distributions of eggs and nymphs in naturally occurring psyllid populations were highly aggregated, following initially aggregated migrations of adults and a contagious dispersion of adults on the flushes within trees as population densities increased. Increased population density in the field resulted in greater dispersion of population was the consequence of females' dispersal and their selection of oviposition sites. Because the exponential increase in dispersion can be predicted by means of the population density of immature stages, a sampling plan was developed from the relationship between the dispersion behaviour and population density rather than the relationship between economic damage and population density.

References

External links
 Species Profile-Asian Citrus Psyllid (Diaphorina citri),  National Invasive Species Information Center, United States National Agricultural Library. Lists general information and resources for Asian Citrus Psyllid.
 Featured Creature: Diaphorina citri; University of Florida article on the biology of the organism.
Species Genome Asian Citrus Psyllid ("Diaphorina citri"); Citrus Greening Solutions International Psyllid Genome Consortium.

Psyllidae
Agricultural pest insects
Citrus pests
Insects described in 1908